Kerstin Wohlbold (born 11 January 1984) is a German handballer for Thüringer HC.

Achievements
Bundesliga:
Winner: 2007, 2008, 2011
German Cup:
Winner: 2011

References

External links
Profile on Thüringer HC official website

1984 births
Living people
People from Friedrichshafen
Sportspeople from Tübingen (region)
German female handball players
Expatriate handball players
German expatriate sportspeople in Austria